Alice Stanley (née Woods; 20 March 1899 – 1991) was an English footballer. She played for Dick, Kerr Ladies, one of the earliest women's association football teams. She was a sprinter and one of the first women to race under Amateur Athletic Association of England (AAA) laws.

Early life 
Born in Sutton, St Helens, Woods started playing football when she was working at a munitions factory in the town and her brother taught her how to play. Before she took up football, she was already a top class sprinter and could run a hundred yards in twelve seconds. She became the first woman to win a race held under Amateur Athletic Association of England (AAA) laws. This historic meet was the first in England to allow women runners and it took place at Blackpool in 1918, when thirteen female athletes ran the race over 80 yards. Woods developed a rivalry with Elaine Burton.

Club career 
Woods began playing for the Dick, Kerr Ladies in 1920. She came to the team after scoring against them for Liverpool Ladies in a 1–0 victory for the Merseyside team in a match played at Wigan. She scored her first goal for the Dick, Kerr Ladies against the French team on 1 May 1920. She travelled to France with the team in 1920 and also played in the Boxing Day match at Goodison Park in 1920. According to verbal evidence from Alice Norris, it was Woods who suggested to team manager Alfred Frankland that Lily Parr would be a good addition to the club. Woods also went on tour to the United States in 1922 and finished playing football in 1928 when she married Herbert Stanley. She died peacefully at her home in Manchester in 1991. She was 92 years old.

Personal life 
Woods's brother John played football for Stalybridge Celtic and Halifax Town. The swimmer Gaynor Stanley is Woods's granddaughter.

References 

1899 births
1991 deaths
Dick, Kerr's Ladies F.C. players
English female sprinters
English women's footballers
Footballers from Merseyside
Footballers from St Helens, Merseyside
Lesbian sportswomen
LGBT association football players
English LGBT sportspeople
Women's association football midfielders
20th-century LGBT people